Murder on the Iditarod Trail is a book written by Sue Henry and published by Atlantic Monthly Press  in 1991, which later went on to win the Anthony Award for Best First Novel in 1992.

References 

Anthony Award-winning works
American mystery novels
1991 American novels
Atlantic Monthly Press books